is a former Japanese football player.

Club statistics

References

External links

j-league
FC Gifu Official website - Profile

1984 births
Living people
Waseda University alumni
Association football people from Fukuoka Prefecture
Japanese footballers
J1 League players
J2 League players
Ventforet Kofu players
Giravanz Kitakyushu players
FC Gifu players
Association football goalkeepers